Aichryson divaricatum is a species of succulent plant of the family Crassulaceae endemic to Madeira.

Description
It has a dark green, ascending stem.

Distribution

References

divaricatum
Endemic flora of Madeira